Llifén is a Chilean town in the commune of Futrono on the shores of Ranco Lake located near the mouth of Calcurrupe River. In 2017 Llifén had a population 768 a slight increase relative to the 748 inhabitants recorded in the 2002 census. Llifén was one of the last places in Chile where artisan fishing was done with fish traps called lollys. Fishing with this technique ceases in the 1970s. 

The town is served by Chollinco Airport.

References

See also
 List of towns in Chile

Populated places in Ranco Province
Populated lakeshore places in Chile